Parchin-e Sofla (also Romanized as Parchīn-e Soflá; also known as Parchīn-e Pā’īn) is a village in Azadlu Rural District of Muran District, Germi County, Ardabil province, Iran. At the 2006 census, its population was 605 in 114 households. The following census in 2011 counted 723 people in 147 households. The latest census in 2016 showed a population of 532 people in 151 households; it was the largest village in its rural district.

References 

Germi County

Towns and villages in Germi County

Populated places in Ardabil Province

Populated places in Germi County